Manoranjan Rai, or more commonly known as Mona Rai was the final chief minister of medieval Sylhet's Gour Kingdom. He is most known for being named after the highest hill in Sylhet city.

Office
His office began in 1260 with ascension of Raja Gour Govinda to the throne. Govinda appointed Rai as his chief minister, replacing the previous King Govardhan's former chief minister Madan Rai. The palace which was used by the past ministers of Gour was gifted by Govinda to Mona Rai, and renamed Mona Rai Palace. It was situated in a hillock near the port for ease in tax collection and civil duties. Govinda built a brick tower in Penchagor named Gorduar, which would serve as his palace and central administration. Gorduar, which remains as ruins today, had seven floors; the second floor was also given to Mona Rai.

Death

With the arrival of Shah Jalal and the Conquest of Sylhet in 1303, Mona Rai was appointed by Govinda as one of the commanders. As Rai was based near the port, he decided to stop river transport and ferries making it difficult for the opponents as the only other option was through the hills. Rai was subsequently killed in the final battle of Gour. Govinda was shocked after hearing of this news and fled with his family and the area came under the rule of Wazir Sikandar Khan Ghazi.

Legacy
The hillock which housed Mona Rai's palace is known even today as the hill of Mona Rai in Chowhatta. It is located next to the dargah of Shah Jalal. Bipin Chandra Pal mentions in his book, "Memories Of My Life And Times", mentions that during his childhood he studied in a government school which was a large brick building standing on top of Mona Rai's Tila. This is backed up by Pandita Ramabai's biography which mentions that she was invited to Sylhet District School, on top of Mona Ray Hill, by a reception committee. During the British Raj, a 0.9 mile by-road was used connecting Sylhet with the hill. This road was named Monarai Tillah Approach Road and housed the Executive Officer's Bungalow in 1948. In 1975, it also housed the buildings for the Roads and Highways Division, Buildings Division and District Judges. The ruins of Rai's fort in Tilagarh is also present.

References

Rulers of Sylhet
14th-century Indian people
14th-century rulers in Asia
Indian Hindus